Xiaoli Wang (12 May 1982, Binzhou) is a Chinese sports sailor. At the 2012 Summer Olympics, she competed in the Women's 470 class.  She and team-mate Huang Xufeng finished in 11th place.  At the 2016 Olympics, she teamed with Huang Lizhu, finishing in 16th place.

At the 2013 470 World Championships, Wang and Huang Xufeng became the first Chinese team to win a medal at the 470 World Championships, winning a bronze medal.  The team were coached by Kevin Burnham and Nick Drougas.

References

Living people
Olympic sailors of China
Chinese female sailors (sport)
Sailors at the 2012 Summer Olympics – 470
Sailors at the 2016 Summer Olympics – 470
Sportspeople from Shandong
1982 births
People from Binzhou
21st-century Chinese women